Robert Overdo (fl. 1368–1386), of Appleby-in-Westmorland, was an English politician.

He was a Member (MP) of the Parliament of England for Appleby in 1368, 1369, 1371, 1372, 1378, January 1380, February 1383, October 1383, April 1384 and 1386.

References

Year of birth missing
Year of death missing
Members of the Parliament of England (pre-1707) for Appleby
English MPs 1368
English MPs 1369
English MPs 1371
English MPs 1372
English MPs 1378
English MPs January 1380
English MPs February 1383
English MPs October 1383
English MPs April 1384
English MPs 1386